Thomas Ryan (1827 – March 5, 1903) was an Irish-American musician.

Born in Ireland, Ryan moved to the United States as a teenager in 1844, and pursued his studies in Boston. In 1849, he formed the Mendelssohn Quintette Club along with August Fries (1st violin), Francis Riha (2nd violin), Eduard Lehmann (viola and flute), and Wulf Fries (cello); Ryan played viola and clarinet. The Club gave its first concert in Boston on December 14, at the showroom of Chickering and Sons. Ryan played with the Club for the next fifty years, by the end being its only remaining founding member.

He co-founded the "National College of Music" in 1872, headquartered at Boston's Tremont Temple. The college employed numerous musician instructors, and attracted a substantial student body. After the fire of November 1872, the college lost many of its students (no longer able to afford tuition), and closed in 1873. Ryan published his memoirs in Recollections of an Old Musician (1899).

References

Further reading
 Thomas Ryan. Recollections of an old musician. NY: E.P. Dutton & company, 1899. Google books

American clarinetists
American violists
Irish clarinetists
Irish violists
1827 births
1903 deaths
19th century in Boston